Club Deportivo Betis San Isidro is a Spanish football club based in Madrid, in the namesake community. Founded in 1931, it plays in segunda regional, holding home games at Estadio Antiguo Canódromo, with a capacity of 4,000 seats.

Season to season

0 seasons in Tercera División

External links
Official website 
Futmadrid team profile 
Madrid FA profile 

Football clubs in Madrid
Divisiones Regionales de Fútbol clubs
Association football clubs established in 1931
1931 establishments in Spain